The Women's Downhill competition in the 2016 FIS Alpine Skiing World Cup involved nine events, including the season finale in St. Moritz, Switzerland.  

Defending champion Lindsey Vonn of the USA won five of the first six races in the season and, after finishing second in a race at La Thuile (the Italian side of Mont Blanc), wrapped the season title (her eighth in the discipline) with one race remaining -- which was fortunate, as Vonn suffered a season ending injury in the very next race (a Super-G).. The downhill at Altenmarkt-Zauchensee was conducted in a rare two-run format due to the course having to be shortened, and 1970s World Cup great Annemarie Moser-Pröll was on hand to congratulate Vonn for equaling (and then surpassing) her all-time record total of World Cup downhill wins.

At the finals, oft-injured 28-year-old Canadian downhiller Larisa Yurkiw, who was just finishing her best season (having been in second place in the season standings (behind Vonn) before the finals and ending up in third), announced her retirement effective immediately.

Standings

DNF = Did Not Finish
DSQ = Disqualified
DNS = Did Not Start
DNQ = Did Not Qualify for run 2 (Altenmarkt only)
DNF1 = Did Not Finish run 1 (Altenmarkt only)
DNF2 = Did Not Finish run 2 (Altenmarkt only)

See also
 2016 Alpine Skiing World Cup – Women's summary rankings
 2016 Alpine Skiing World Cup – Women's Overall
 2016 Alpine Skiing World Cup – Women's Super-G
 2016 Alpine Skiing World Cup – Women's Giant Slalom
 2016 Alpine Skiing World Cup – Women's Slalom
 2016 Alpine Skiing World Cup – Women's Combined

References

External links
 

Women's Downhill
FIS Alpine Ski World Cup women's downhill discipline titles